Tilisuna-Schwarzhorn (also called Schwarzhara) is a  in the Sulzfluh sub-range of the Rätikon mountain range in the Austrian state Vorarlberg. It has a long ridge from north to south and wide scarps east and west. Besides the main summit, there is a second summit called Kleines Schwarzhorn. Both summits are separated by the col Fürkele. The alpine club hut Tilisunahütte (2208 m) is located near the Tilisuna-Schwarzhorn.

First ascensionists were land surveyors in 1853. Nowadays there are two common routes to the summit:
 Easiest route: From south starting at Tilisunahütte via the saddle Schwarze Scharte in 45 to 75 minutes; some parts UIAA grade II, mostly grade I. This route was opened by J. S. Douglass and Chr. Zudrell in 1883.
 North ridge: From upper station of cable car Grabs via Alpe Alpila and Schwarzhornsattel (2166 m) in 2–2½ hours; UIAA grade II. This route was opened by A. Remann, G. Gaßner and B. Hemmerle in 1886.

References 

Two-thousanders of Austria
Mountains of the Alps
Mountains of Vorarlberg